Jennifer Mendenhall (born February 7, 1960), commonly known by the alias Kate Reading, is an American actress and audiobook narrator. She has won 6 Audie Awards and 46 Earphone Awards.

Personal life 
Mendenhall was born on February 7, 1960, in Brooklyn, New York, to William Kenneth Mendenhall, Jr. and Barbara (Suchy) Mendenhall. Her parents moved to England when she was a baby. In 1978, she returned to the United States to attend the University of Virginia. She graduated with a Bachelor of Arts in French and Drama in 1983.

Mendenhall married Michael Kramer on October 24, 1992.  They currently live in the Washington, D.C., area with their two children.

Awards and honors

Awards

"Best of" lists

Stage performances

Filmography

References 

University of Virginia alumni
1960 births
Actors from New York City
Living people
Audiobook narrators